Tall-e Quchan (also Romanized as Tall-e Qūchān) is a village in Vahdat Rural District, Mugarmun District, Landeh County, Kohgiluyeh and Boyer-Ahmad Province, Iran. At the 2006 census, its population was 34, in 7 families.

References 

Populated places in Landeh County